Justice Morse may refer to:

Allen B. Morse, associate justice of the Michigan Supreme Court
James L. Morse, associate justice of the Vermont Supreme Court